Huilong Township is a township of Yongshun County in northwestern Hunan province, China, located  southeast of the county seat and  southwest of Zhangjiajie as the crow flies. , it has five villages under its administration.

See also 
 List of township-level divisions of Hunan

References 

Townships of Hunan
Divisions of Yongshun County